Violet Peters  is an Indian athlete.  She won a gold  medal in   relay  in the 1954 Asian Games with Christine Brown, Stephie d'Souza and Mary d'Souza, with a time of 49.5 seconds.

References

Indian female sprinters
Athletes (track and field) at the 1954 Asian Games
Athletes (track and field) at the 1958 Asian Games
Asian Games gold medalists for India
Asian Games bronze medalists for India
Asian Games medalists in athletics (track and field)
Medalists at the 1954 Asian Games
Medalists at the 1958 Asian Games